Hypomyrina nomion, the dark orange playboy, is a butterfly in the family Lycaenidae. It is found in Guinea-Bissau, Guinea, Sierra Leone, Ivory Coast, Ghana, Togo, Benin, southern Nigeria, Cameroon, the Central African Republic, southern Sudan and Uganda. The habitat consists of the transition zone between savanna and forest.

References

External links

Die Gross-Schmetterlinge der Erde 13: Die Afrikanischen Tagfalter. Plate XIII 65 h

Butterflies described in 1891
Deudorigini
Butterflies of Africa